The Poincaré group, named after Henri Poincaré (1906), was first defined by Hermann Minkowski (1908) as the group of Minkowski spacetime isometries.  It is a ten-dimensional non-abelian Lie group that is of importance as a model in our understanding of the most basic fundamentals of physics.

Overview 
A Minkowski spacetime isometry has the property that the interval between events is left invariant. For example, if everything were postponed by two hours, including the two events and the path you took to go from one to the other, then the time interval between the events recorded by a stop-watch you carried with you would be the same. Or if everything were shifted five kilometres to the west, or turned 60 degrees to the right, you would also see no change in the interval. It turns out that the proper length of an object is also unaffected by such a shift. A time or space reversal (a reflection) is also an isometry of this group.

In Minkowski space (i.e. ignoring the effects of gravity), there are ten degrees of freedom of the isometries, which may be thought of as translation through time or space (four degrees, one per dimension); reflection through a plane (three degrees, the freedom in orientation of this plane); or a "boost" in any of the three spatial directions (three degrees). Composition of transformations is the operation of the Poincaré group, with proper rotations being produced as the composition of an even number of reflections.

In classical physics, the Galilean group is a comparable ten-parameter group that acts on absolute time and space. Instead of boosts, it features shear mappings to relate co-moving frames of reference.

Poincaré symmetry 
Poincaré symmetry is the full symmetry of special relativity. It includes:
 translations (displacements) in time and space (P), forming the abelian Lie group of translations on space-time;
 rotations in space, forming the non-abelian Lie group of three-dimensional rotations (J);
 boosts, transformations connecting two uniformly moving bodies (K).

The last two symmetries, J and K, together make the Lorentz group (see also Lorentz invariance); the semi-direct product of the translations group and the Lorentz group then produce the Poincaré group. Objects that are invariant under this group are then said to possess Poincaré invariance or relativistic invariance.

10 generators (in four spacetime dimensions) associated with the Poincaré symmetry, by Noether's theorem, imply 10 conservation laws: 1 for the energy, 3 for the momentum, 3 for the angular momentum and 3 for the velocity of the center of mass.

Poincaré group 
The Poincaré group is the group of Minkowski spacetime isometries. It is a ten-dimensional noncompact Lie group. The abelian group of translations is a normal subgroup, while the Lorentz group is also a subgroup, the stabilizer of the origin. The Poincaré group itself is the minimal subgroup of the affine group which includes all translations and Lorentz transformations. More precisely, it is a semidirect product of the translations and the Lorentz group, 

with group multiplication
.

Another way of putting this is that the Poincaré group is a group extension of the Lorentz group by a vector representation of it; it is sometimes dubbed, informally, as the inhomogeneous Lorentz group. In turn, it can also be obtained as a group contraction of the de Sitter group SO(4,1) ~ Sp(2,2), as the de Sitter radius goes to infinity.

Its positive energy unitary irreducible representations are indexed by mass (nonnegative number) and spin (integer or half integer) and are associated with particles in quantum mechanics (see Wigner's classification).

In accordance with the Erlangen program, the geometry of Minkowski space is defined by the Poincaré group: Minkowski space is considered as a homogeneous space for the group.

In quantum field theory, the universal cover of the Poincaré group

which may be identified with the double cover

Here  is the group of complex   matrices with unit determinant, isomorphic to the Lorentz-signature spin group .

Poincaré algebra

The Poincaré algebra is the Lie algebra of the Poincaré group. It is a Lie algebra extension of the Lie algebra of the Lorentz group. More specifically, the proper, orthochronous  part of the Lorentz subgroup (its identity component), is connected to the identity and is thus provided by the exponentiation   of this Lie algebra.  In component form, the Poincaré algebra is given by the commutation relations:

The bottom commutation relation is the ("homogeneous") Lorentz group, consisting of rotations, and boosts, .  In this notation, the entire Poincaré algebra is expressible in noncovariant (but more practical) language as
 

where the bottom line commutator of two boosts is often referred to as a "Wigner rotation". In terms of the physical parameters, we have

The Poincaré group is the full symmetry group of any relativistic field theory. As a result, all elementary particles fall in representations of this group. Since CPT symmetry is invariant in quantum field theory, a time-reversal quantum number may be constructed from those given.

As a topological space, the group has four connected components: the component of the identity; the time reversed component; the spatial inversion component; and the component which is both time-reversed and spatially inverted.

Other dimensions 
The definitions above can be generalized to arbitrary dimensions in a straightforward manner. The d-dimensional Poincaré group is analogously defined by the semi-direct product

with the analogous multiplication

.

Super-Poincaré algebra
A related observation is that the representations of the Lorentz group include a pair of inequivalent two-dimensional complex spinor representations  and  whose tensor product  is the adjoint representation. One may identify this last bit with four-dimensional Minkowski space itself (as opposed to identifying it with a spin-1 particle, as would normally be done for a pair of fermions, e.g. a pion being composed of a quark-anti-quark pair). This strongly suggests that it might be possible to extend the Poincaré algebra to also include spinors. This leads directly to the notion of the super-Poincaré algebra. The mathematical appeal of this idea is that one is working with the fundamental representations, instead of the adjoint representations.  The physical appeal of this idea is that the fundamental representations correspond to fermions, which are seen in nature. So far, however, the implied supersymmetry here, of a symmetry between spatial and fermionic directions, has not been seen experimentally in nature.  The experimental issue can roughly be stated as the question: if we live in the adjoint representation (Minkowski spacetime), then where is the fundamental representation hiding?

See also 
 Euclidean group
 Representation theory of the Poincaré group
 Wigner's classification
 Symmetry in quantum mechanics
 Pauli–Lubanski pseudovector
 Particle physics and representation theory
Continuous spin particle

Notes

References 

 
 
 

Lie groups
Group
Quantum field theory
Theory of relativity
Symmetry